Marcelo Dilglay Damiao (born 19 March 1975 in Campinas, São Paulo, Brazil) is a Brazilian-Italian basketball player. A member of the Italian men's national team, Damiao competed with the squad at the 1998 FIBA World Championship and the 2000 Summer Olympics.

References

1975 births
Living people
Italian men's basketball players
Brazilian men's basketball players
Brazilian emigrants to Italy
Lega Basket Serie A players
Olympic basketball players of Italy
Basketball players at the 2000 Summer Olympics
Sportspeople from Campinas
Pallacanestro Reggiana players
1998 FIBA World Championship players